El Centro (Spanish for "The Center") is a city and county seat of Imperial County, California, United States. El Centro is the largest city in the Imperial Valley, the east anchor of the Southern California Border Region, and the core urban area and principal city of the El Centro metropolitan area which encompasses all of Imperial County. El Centro is also the largest U.S. city to lie entirely below sea level.

The modern city is home to retail, transportation, wholesale, and agricultural industries. There are also two international border crossings nearby for commercial and noncommercial vehicles. El Centro's census population as of 2020 was 44,322, up from 42,598 at the 2010 Census.

History

Spanish explorer Melchor Díaz was one of the first Europeans to visit the area around El Centro and Imperial Valley in 1540. The explorer Juan Bautista de Anza also explored the area in 1776 (an elementary school in El Centro now bears his name). Years later, after the Mexican–American War, the northern half of the valley was annexed by the U.S., while the southern half remained under Mexican rule. Small scale settlement in natural aquifer areas occurred in the early 19th century (the present-day site of Mexicali), but most permanent settlement (Anglo Americans on the U.S. side, Mexicans on the other side) was after 1900.

Originally part of San Diego County, the Imperial Valley was settled by farmers once water from the Colorado River was diverted via canals to irrigate the desert valley floor.

In 1906, the land on which El Centro was later built was purchased by W. F. Holt and C.A. Barker.

In 1907 Imperial County was split off from San Diego County; by then much of the valley was successfully irrigated.

Before the town began, the railroad had established a station and named the place Cabarker. The name honored C.A. Barker, a friend of the landowner. The first post office in El Centro opened in 1905.

Early growth was rapid with the city's population reaching 1,610 by 1910 and more than tripling by 1920 to 5,646 people. One reason for this rapid early growth was El Centro's successful battle with the City of Imperial to become the county seat. In these early days, relationships among the cities of the Imperial Valley were often intensely competitive, reflecting the particular frontier character of the area and the fact that six cities within a twenty-mile radius were all established within one generation. These cities were in a horse race to win the prize of being the Valley's leading city and the intense competition is measured by the fact that it took twenty years to get a county fair started because of strong local loyalties on the County Board of Supervisors.

The City of El Centro was incorporated on April 16, 1908. One reason for this rapid growth was El Centro's becoming the county seat of Imperial County.

Population growth was slow, but accelerated in the 1930s, and again in the 1940s, despite the city being hard hit by a 7.1 earthquake in May 1940.

By the mid-1940s, El Centro had become the second largest city in the Imperial Valley, with a population of about 11,000 people. El Centro had also become the location of the Imperial Irrigation District (IID) administrative offices.

Agriculture has been an important industry within El Centro since the 1940s, because of its strategic location near rail lines and U.S. Highways 80 and 99 – more than 35 growers and shippers still operate in El Centro. However, by the early 1980s the two largest employment sectors in El Centro were government and wholesale/retail trade, reflecting El Centro's emerging role as a regional administrative and commercial center.

Imperial Valley Mall opened on the southeast side of the city in 2005.

Sites of interest

The nearby Algodones Dunes, the largest dune field in the US, draws thousands of visitors each year, mainly for off-road driving. The El Centro Naval Air Facility  to the west is home to the annual Blue Angels flight maneuvering event. Stark Field is home of a minor league baseball team El Centro Imperials of the Arizona Summer League.

Geography

El Centro is located in the Imperial Valley (considered locally as synonymous with Imperial County). The Imperial Valley is in the Colorado Desert, an extension of the larger Sonoran Desert.

The agriculture industry's demand for water is supplied by canals diverting water from the nearby Colorado River. The Salton Sea was created after a 1905 flood from the Colorado River.

Geologically, the El Centro earthquake of 1940  on the Mercalli intensity scale. It was the first major earthquake to be recorded by a strong-motion seismograph located next to a fault rupture. It was intensely studied by structural engineers and assumed to be typical until the Northridge earthquake of 1994. In this region, the geology is dominated by the transition of the tectonic plate boundary from rift to transverse fault. The southernmost strands of the San Andreas Fault connect the northernmost extensions of the East Pacific Rise. Consequently, the region is subject to earthquakes, and the crust is being stretched, resulting in a sinking of the terrain over time.

Climate
El Centro has a desert climate and is the southernmost desert city below sea level in the continental United States. It features long, extremely hot summers, and mild winters. El Centro has over 350 days of sunshine and under  of rain annually. Winter temperatures are in the mid to high 60s with over-night lows in the low 40s. During summer days of June; typically the driest month of the year with no precipitation, the dry, desert heat can push temperatures well into the 100s, while the nights stay in the high 70s. The North American Monsoon typically increases moisture. At times, the climate can resemble that of tropical areas in the Caribbean. This leads to daily thunderstorms that can bring hail, downpours, lightning, and dust storms, more commonly known as Haboob. During the Eastern Pacific hurricane season, remnants of hurricanes or tropical storms may track through the desert and can result in heavy thunderstorms. This can lead to significantly higher than normal precipitation, at times bringing heavy rain.

The precipitation in the winter months is predominantly rain showers from the occasional winter storms. At times these storms bring cold temperatures to El Centro and surrounding cities, and mountain snowfall to the nearby Mountains. El Niño and La Niña play a large role in how much rain falls in the winter, La Nina typically brings drier and cooler conditions to El Centro and surrounding areas. El Niño tends to being wetter and average temperatures. 

Snow is almost totally unknown in the area. However, on December 12, 1934 a very powerful winter storm brought record cold and snowfall to El Centro and surrounding areas of the Imperial Valley. Snow began falling at 8:45 p.m. December 11th and by 5 a.m. the next day (December 12th)1-4 inches of snow had blanketed the desert floor.

Another instance of freezing precipitation was observed in December 1967 as a mix of sleet hail.  On average there are about 15 days that dip into the mid to lower 30s.

Being below sea level, El Centro has warm days and cool nights in winter.

Economy

As of 2009 the employment of El Centro residents is dominated by the local government, California state government, and federal government. Two nearby prisons (Centinela and Calipatria) and a U.S. Border Patrol station provide employment; The Economist states that the prisons and border patrol were "relatively untouched" by the late-2000s recession. The El Centro area has many farming plots, where carrots, lettuce, and other crops are produced, and therefore the El Centro economy is subject to seasonal variations like other farming areas. Between November and March in winter periods, El Centro-area farmers harvest lettuce for $8–10 per hour. During March the harvest moves to the north and is no longer in El Centro; in previous eras farmers migrated, while in the first decade of the 21st century many collect unemployment benefits during the summer.

El Centro is surrounded by thousands of acres of farmland that has transformed the desert into one of the most productive farming regions in California with an annual crop production of over $1 billion. Agriculture is the largest industry in Imperial County and accounts for 48% of all employment.

Being the commercial center of Imperial County, fifty percent of the jobs in the El Centro come from the service and retail sector.

A recent growth in the interest of Imperial County as a filming location, has spurred growth in servicing this industry. Due to its desert environment and proximity to Los Angeles, California, movies are sometimes filmed in the sand dunes outside the agricultural portions of the Imperial County. These have included Return of the Jedi, Stargate, The Scorpion King, Jarhead, Into the Wild, and American Sniper.

During the late-2000s recession
According to the Bureau of Labor Statistics, as of April 30, 2009 the El Centro area had a 25.0% unemployment rate, the highest for a Metropolitan Area in the country. By August of that year, El Centro's unemployment rate was 27.5%, three times the overall United States unemployment rate of 9.7%. The Economist stated that the city is not the "centre of the Great Recession" like the figure would appear to indicate. While El Centro has a seasonal farming economy, there is still a fixed "baseline" unemployment at 12%. Timothy Kelly, the head of the Imperial Valley Economic Development Corporation, estimated that between 40,000 and 60,000 residents of Mexicali work in El Centro. The Economist added that there are likely many El Centro residents who work in Mexicali and collect unemployment benefits in El Centro; Ruben Duran, the city manager of El Centro, said that if the Mexicali jobs were factored into the employment rate, El Centro would have a normal employment rate.  The manager of a job search agency called One Stop, said that about 3,000 people per month come into her agency; she says that some make a genuine effort to find jobs, while many do not have motivation to actually find a job, but to instead show proof that they tried to find a job. Kelly stated that unemployment fraud does not account for all of the issues with the El Centro area; he said that many residents have a lack of education and a lack of English language proficiency, so some of them cannot find jobs. The Economist added that the collapse of the housing market eliminated some construction jobs; the magazine countered that the scenario is true in many places in the United States. In December 2008 listed as No. 5 on Forbes.com's list of "The Top 10 Places in America Where Homes are Losing their Value Fastest" with 31.4% of homeowners owing more on their mortgages than their homes are worth. A national report on the effects of the "Great recession" of 2008/09 has found El Centro and the Imperial Valley in the top 5 poorest medium-sized cities in the U.S. in poverty and unemployment rates.

Culture

While the majority of the residents in this community are Hispanic, there is a diverse population with a wide array of interests.  In the winter residents race on nearby sand dunes using four wheel drive buggies. During the summer residents spend time indoors instead of outside. Spanish is a dominant language among residents and over the radio. Many area residents live in both the United States and Mexico and go across the border frequently.

Demographics

2010
The 2010 United States Census reported that El Centro had a population of 42,598. The racial makeup of El Centro was 25,376 (59.6%) White, 1,081 (2.5%) African American, 554 (1.3%) Native American. Hispanic or Latino of any race were 34,751 persons (81.6%), 965 (2.3%) Asian, 34 (0.1%) Pacific Islander, 12,356 (29.0%) from other races, and 2,232 (5.2%) from two or more races.

The Census reported that 41,782 people (98.1% of the population) lived in households, 296 (0.7%) lived in non-institutionalized group quarters, and 520 (1.2%) were institutionalized.

There were 13,108 households, out of which 6,257 (47.7%) had children under the age of 18 living in them, 6,550 (50.0%) were opposite-sex married couples living together, 2,845 (21.7%) had a female householder with no husband present, 815 (6.2%) had a male householder with no wife present.  There were 804 (6.1%) unmarried opposite-sex partnerships, and 58 (0.4%) same-sex married couples or partnerships. Of the households, 2,458 (18.8%) were made up of individuals, and 1,004 (7.7%) had someone living alone who was 65 years of age or older. The average household size was 3.19.  There were 10,210 families (77.9% of all households); the average family size was 3.64.

The population was spread out, with 12,671 people (29.7%) under the age of 18, 4,803 people (11.3%) aged 18 to 24, 10,661 people (25.0%) aged 25 to 44, 9,907 people (23.3%) aged 45 to 64, and 4,556 people (10.7%) who were 65 years of age or older.  The median age was 31.8 years. For every 100 females, there were 94.7 males.  For every 100 females age 18 and over, there were 90.3 males.

The homeowner vacancy rate was 2.8%; the rental vacancy rate was 7.2%.  21,429 people (50.3% of the population) lived in owner-occupied housing units and 20,353 people (47.8%) lived in rental housing units.

2000
As of the census of 2000, there were 37,835 people, 11,439 households, and 8,910 families residing in the city. The racial makeup of the city was 46.9% White, 3.2% Black or African American, 1.0% Native American, 3.5% Asian, 0.1% Pacific Islander, 41.7% from other races, and 3.7% from two or more races.  74.6% of the population were Hispanic or Latino of any race.

There were 11,439 households, out of which 47.4% had children under the age of 18 living with them, 53.9% were married couples living together, 18.7% had a female householder with no husband present, and 22.1% were non-families. Of all households, 18.8% were made up of individuals, and 7.3% had someone living alone who was 65 years of age or older.  The average household size was 3.2 and the average family size was 3.7.

In the city, the population was spread out, with 33.6% under the age of 18, 9.7% from 18 to 24, 28.9% from 25 to 44, 18.5% from 45 to 64, and 9.3% who were 65 years of age or older.  The median age was 30 years. For every 100 females, there were 96.6 males.  For every 100 females age 18 and over, there were 93.5 males.

The median income for a household in the city was $33,161, and the median income for a family was $36,910. Males had a median income of $36,753 versus $24,514 for females. The per capita income for the city was $13,874.  About 20.6% of families and 22.8% of the population were below the poverty line, including 29.5% of those under age 18 and 14.8% of those age 65 or over.

In 2009 the Latinos in El Centro mainly consisted of dual citizens and permanent resident card (green card) holders. Illegal immigrants tended to go through Imperial County instead of staying in Imperial County.

Education
Within its boundary, there are three school districts – McCabe Union Elementary School District, El Centro School District and Central Union High School District.

El Centro has 11 elementary schools, four middle/junior high schools and three high schools:

Elementary schools
 De Anza Magnet School
 Desert Gardens Elementary School
 Harding Elementary School
 Hedrick Elementary School (named after Margaret Hedrick, a woman who had been teaching and working in schools for 55 years, 35 of them in the El Centro School District).
 King Elementary School
 Lincoln Elementary School
 McCabe Elementary School
 McKinley Elementary School
 Meadows Elementary School
 Sunflower Elementary
 Washington Elementary School
 St. Mary's Catholic School

Middle and junior high schools
 Corfman Middle School (Grades 4–8)
 Kennedy Middle School
 Wilson Junior High
 St. Mary's Catholic School

High schools

The Central Union High School District includes two four-year comprehensive high schools (Central Union and Southwest) and one alternative education school (Desert Oasis).  The school district's 3,450 students are supported by more than 350 certified and classified staff.  The District is governed by a five-member Board of Trustees.
 Central Union High School (Central Union was established near the time when the city was established and celebrated its centennial in 2008.)
 Desert Oasis High School
 Southwest High School, whose performing arts theater is named after local musician Jimmie Cannon, director of CUHS's Great Spartan Band from 1966 to 1996

Colleges and universities
Opportunities to attend college are available through Imperial Valley College, a local 2-year college, and an extension of San Diego State University located in the nearby city of Calexico. San Diego State University's Calexico Campus offers a variety of bachelor's and master's degrees.

Transportation

Freeways and highways

There are three major highways that serve El Centro. Interstate 8 connects San Diego to the west and Yuma, Arizona to the east. State Route 86 and State Route 111 parallel each other as they go north to Brawley before running along the west and east shores of the Salton Sea, respectively, on their way to the Coachella Valley. Going south from El Centro, State Route 86 terminates at State Route 111, which runs to Calexico and Mexicali, Mexico.

Public transportation

Imperial Valley Transit is the primary provider of mass transportation in the Imperial Valley. Formed in 1989 with just 3 buses and serving just 3,000 people per month, the agency now currently serves more than 73,000 riders within the area per month.

Through a partnership between the Imperial County Transportation Commission (ICTC), the Yuma County Intergovernmental Public Transportation Authority (YCIPTA), and the Quechan Indian Tribe, Yuma County Area Transit Turquoise Route 10 buses stop at El Centro locations and connects the city to Winterhaven, California and Yuma, Arizona.

Greyhound Lines provides intercity bus service to El Centro.

Airports
 Imperial County Airport is located in nearby Imperial. Service is subsidized by the Essential Air Service program. The nearest large international airports are San Diego International Airport and Mexicali International Airport.
 Naval Air Facility El Centro is a U.S. Navy airfield
 Douthitt Strip Airport is a former military airfield, now a private use airport.

Politics
El Centro operates under a council–manager form of government. The members of the City Council also sit as the Community Development Commission (Commission) and Redevelopment Agency (Agency) governing boards. The City Manager is empowered as the Executive Director of the Commission and Agency.

Government
The City of El Centro Public Works operates water, sewer, and trash services for the city.

Notable people
Notable people from El Centro or who lived in El Centro for an extended period of time.
 Walter Beasley (born 1961), jazz musician and professor
 Glenn Cadrez (born 1970), American football linebacker for the Denver Broncos
 Julian Segura Camacho (born 1969), Mexican American literature author
 Dino Cazares (born 1966) heavy metal musician, songwriter, and producer
 Cher (born 1946), pop musician, actress
 Roscoe Cook (1939–2011), holder of three world records in track
 Doug Harvey (1930–2018), Major League Baseball Hall of Fame umpire
 Ken Howard (1944–2016), actor
 Donal Logue (born 1966), actor
 Emmy Lou Packard (1914–1998), fine artist, printmaker
 David Varela (born 1982), artist and philanthropist

References

External links

El Centro Chamber of Commerce and Visitors Bureau
El Centro Earthquake 1940

 
Cities in Imperial County, California

County seats in California
Communities in the Lower Colorado River Valley
Imperial Valley
Incorporated cities and towns in California
Populated places in the Colorado Desert
Populated places established in 1908
1908 establishments in California